The Basque Ball: Skin Against Stone is a 2003 Spanish documentary film written and directed by Julio Medem.

Overview
The film's purported intention is to create a bridge between the different political positions that coexist, sometimes violently, in the Basque Country. In order to do so, Medem edits the interviews giving a sense of dialogue between parties that refused to sit down and talk. Due to its lack of contextualization, the film may be hard to understand to audiences without previous knowledge of the Basque problem—it is obviously a film designed to be viewed by Spanish audiences, or people familiar with the issues.

The movie also utilizes footage from the Basque portions of the 1955 travelogue Around The World With Orson Welles, and continually intercuts between interviews and jai alai players.

Criticism
One of the main controversies of the documentary is that the two principal protagonists in the controversy, the then incumbent Partido Popular and ETA refused to take part in the interviews. The former went so far as to request the organisers of the Donostia-San Sebastian International Film Festival to reconsider the film's suitability. This, in turn, has led some to call it an incomplete documentary.

It has also been openly criticized by both extremes, and Medem, who is Basque, has been accused of being both pro-ETA and pro-"Spanish occupation". Indeed, two of the interviewees, Iñaki Ezquerra and Gotzone Mora (both members of the intellectual group the Ermua Forum) demanded that Medem retract their interviews, accusing him of presenting the Spanish Guardia Civil and police forces as torturers and ETA and their followers as victims. Despite these protests, their interviews remained due to the film's imminent release date. They did not, however, appear on the 7-hour DVD Edition.

There is a three-disc special edition DVD released with seven hours of edited footage that goes deeper into the history of the Basque Country and a Spanish-language book.

Awards and nominations
 2004: Nominated, Goya Awards, Best Documentary
 2004: Nominated, European Film Awards, Best Documentary
 2004: Nominated, Cartagena Film Festival, Best Film

See also 
 List of Spanish films of 2003

Notes

External links
 .
 
 

2003 films
Basque politics
Basque-language films
2000s French-language films
2000s Spanish-language films
Documentary films about politics
Films directed by Julio Medem
Spanish documentary films
2003 documentary films
2000s English-language films
2000s Spanish films